Maramureș is a geographical and historical region in present-day Romania and Ukraine.

Maramureș or Máramaros may also refer to:

 Máramaros County, a historic county in the former Kingdom of Hungary
 Maramureș County, a county in Romania; in 1920–1938
 Maramureș Region, a former administrative unit in Romania, from 1960 to 1968
 Romanian Catholic Diocese of Maramureș, a diocese of the Romanian Greek Catholic Church
 Maramureș Mountains Natural Park, a protected area in Romania
 Maramureș dialect, one of the dialects of the Romanian language
 Maramureș Airport, a minor international airport in northwest Romania, located in Tăuții-Măgherăuș
 Wooden churches of Maramureș, specific style old churches made of wood beams

See also 
 History of Maramureș
 Sighetu Marmației